Pteromalus cassotis is a species of parasitic wasp in the family Pteromalidae that parasitizes the chrysalides of monarch butterflies. They are gregarious parasitoids, meaning a single female lays many eggs in a single host. Research into this species has documented that up to 425 adult wasps can emerge from a single chrysalis. The wasps have a heavy female bias, averaging 90% female. Maximum entropy models suggest that the natural habitat of this species encompasses the continental United States, southern Canada and parts of Mexico; areas inhabited by the caterpillars of monarch butterflies, which are the larvae's hosts.

References 

Pteromalidae
Insects described in 1889
Hymenoptera of North America